The Beaver Bay Group is a geologic group in Alaska. It preserves fossils dating back to the Paleogene period.

See also

 List of fossiliferous stratigraphic units in Alaska
 Paleontology in Alaska

References
 

Paleogene stratigraphic units of North America
Geologic groups of Alaska